The Wingate Bulldogs are the athletic teams that represent Wingate University, located in Wingate, North Carolina, in NCAA Division II intercollegiate sports. The Bulldogs compete as members of the South Atlantic Conference for all 22 varsity sports. Wingate has been a member of the SAC since 1989.

History
Wingate University tied for second place in the 2022 NCAA Division II Award of Excellence competition, recognizing its long-running partnership with the United Way Day of Caring.

Wingate University is ranked first among NCAA Division II Academic All-America producing schools for having 125 Academic All-America student-athletes since January 1, 2000.

Wingate University has won the South Atlantic Conference Athletic Excellence Award for the past 13 years. The South Atlantic Conference Echols Athletic Excellence Award is presented annually to the member athletic department that earns the highest overall finish based on final regular season standings. Points are based on final tournament standings in the sports of men’s cross country, women’s cross country, men’s golf and women’s golf. The trophy is presented at the SAC Annual Business Meeting at the conclusion of each school year.

Wingate also offers several intramural leagues and tournaments during the school year. Intramural leagues are formed in flag football, basketball, floor hockey, volleyball and soccer. Tournaments are held in billiards, racquetball, sand volleyball and softball, as well as a Punt, Pass, and Kick competition.

Varsity teams

List of teams

Men's sports (10)
Baseball
Basketball
Cross country
Football
Golf
Lacrosse
Soccer
Swimming and diving
Tennis
Track and field

Women's sports (10)
Basketball
Cross country
Golf
Lacrosse
Soccer
Softball
Swimming and diving
Tennis
Track and field
Volleyball

National championships

Team

Individual

References

External links